Afritada is a Philippine dish consisting of chicken, beef, or pork braised in tomato sauce with carrots, potatoes, and red and green bell peppers. It is served on white rice and is a common everyday Filipino meal. It can also be used to cook seafood.

Etymology
The name afritada is derived from Spanish fritada  ("fried"), referring to the first step of the preparation in which the meat is pan-fried before simmering in the tomato sauce.

Description
Afritada is a braised dish. It is first made by sautéing garlic and onion and then adding the diced meat to fry until tender. After the meat is sufficiently browned, water and tomato paste are poured into the pan, along with diced carrots, potatoes and sliced red and green bell peppers. Sliced tomatoes, peas, chickpeas, or beans can also be added. It can be spiced to taste with salt, black pepper, bay leaves, and fish sauce. The mixture is simmered until the vegetables are cooked. It is served on white rice.

Variants
Afritada has different names based on the main ingredients of the dish. The most common ones are afritadang manok (chicken afritada), afritadang baka (beef afritada), and afritadang baboy (pork afritada). Afritada can also be used to cook seafood, like fish (afritadang isda) or mussels (afritadang tahong), utilizing the same basic process as meat afritadas.

Afritada is also commonly cooked hamonado-style (with pineapple chunks). This sweet variant is usually known as "pineapple afritada". It is commonly confused with pininyahang manok, braised chicken also made with pineapples. However, the latter does not use tomato sauce.

Similar dishes
Afritada is very similar to Filipino menudo and kaldereta, as both also use tomato sauce or banana ketchup. However, menudo includes sliced liver, while kaldereta exclusively uses goat meat.

See also
 Chicken Marengo
 Ginataan
 Adobo
 Kare-kare
 Pinakbet
 Sinigang
 Sarsiado
 Tinola

References

Philippine cuisine
Meat dishes
Tomato dishes
Stews
Meat and potatoes dishes
Seafood dishes
Pineapple dishes